The men's freestyle 90 kilograms at the 1996 Summer Olympics as part of the wrestling program were held at the Georgia World Congress Center from August 1 to August 2. The gold and silver medalists were determined by the final match of the main single-elimination bracket. The losers advanced to the repechage. These matches determined the bronze medalist for the event.

Results

Round 1

Round 2

Round 3

Round 4

Round 5

Round 6

Finals

Final standing

References

External links
Official Report

Freestyle 90kg